Clara Félicia Aranda (born 2 April 1988) is a Swedish politician and a member of the Riksdag for the Sweden Democrats party.

Aranda was elected to the Riksdag during the 2018 Swedish general election representing the constituency of Skåne County. She has also served as a councilor for the Sweden Democrats in Östergötland where she was the SD's group leader. Aranda is also the SD's spokeswoman on mental health issues and serves on the education committee in parliament.

References 

Living people
1988 births
People from Norrköping
Members of the Riksdag from the Sweden Democrats
21st-century Swedish politicians
21st-century Swedish women politicians
Women members of the Riksdag
Members of the Riksdag 2018–2022
Members of the Riksdag 2022–2026